Voranava District is a district in Western Belarus, in Grodno Region. Its administrative center is the town of Voranava.

Demography
Ethnic composition:
 Poles  - 80.8%
 Belarusians - 13%
 Lithuanians and others comprise the rest.

Notable residents 
 Ludwik Narbutt (1832, Šaǔry - 1863), military commander during the January Uprising who led a large unit of insurgents in the region of the town of Lida

References

 
Districts of Grodno Region